, also known as The Promise to The Chura Sea 3, is a Japanese television series or drama. It was broadcast as five episodes on NHK from 2004-09-13 to 2004-10-11.

Story
In the after events of Churasan II, it is now the celebration of the lunar new year. Eri and Fumiya have been visiting family in Okinawa with their son Kazuya. Eri continues her career as a nurse in Tokyo; she's now a visiting nurse while Fumiya continues to be a surgeon at Tokyo Hospital. Eri's grandma, affectionately called Obaa (granny), was last seen married, but now single again, presuming the husband she married died or left her shortly after.

Back Ippukan, Karinin and Shimada continues to be a loving elderly couple; Shibata and Yoki became parents to their first daughter and child, Shiori, and is loved by all. Shouko and Keitatsu are expecting their first child together, however, Keitatsu ran away as he felt severely pressured to be a good father and husband. Eri was the most upset as her own little brother would abandon Shouko and yet-to-be-born child in such a state. However, Fumiya calmed family nerves as he believes Keitatsu didn't do it for selfish reasons, but he due to the burden of responsibility. Shouko decided to move back to Okinawa to be tended by Eri's parents (her in-laws), believing that Keitatsu would eventually come home for their child.

Meanwhile, Eri and Haruka is minding a terminally ill patient, Tsujiuchi. However, her daughter, Aiko, is acting out due to her mother's illness and takes her anger upon the medics that only manage her mother's suffering, but not cure her. Mariya has been suffering writer's block and lost all inspiration to write her next great work. Seeing how Aiko is acting, Eri couldn't leave it alone and took a personal interest in helping out Tsujiuchi and Aiko. Things were a challenge at first, Aiko have trouble accepting the fact her mother is going to die soon. Eri at first invited Aiko to stay with her at Ippukan, but Aiko only ran back home; Eri decided something more drastic and take her to stay with her Okinawan family.

While in Okinawa, the Kohagura family took turns looking after her, showing Aiko the delights of life in Okinawa. Eri's older half-brother, Keisho, invented yet another variant of his beloved creation, Goya (bitter melon) Man, with the Goya Man Game (another likely product failure). Through Eri's reports about Aiko, Tsujiuchi is happy to learn that her daughter has developed a brighter attitude and wants to join her there. With Haruka's medical blessing, she was allowed to travel to Okinawa for the mother-daughter duo back together again. Both ladies were so happy to meet again and Tsujiuchi was especially happy to see Aiko changed for the better; Tsujiuchi was deeply touched when she saw her daughter perform a traditional Okinawan dance.

Inspired by recent events, Mariya used the story of Aiko as the basis for her new novel. Although a well-written story, the book didn't catch the attention she had hoped; she was proud to have it published nonetheless. With the help of good friends, Keitatsu was taught the meaning of rock is justice and what he's doing isn't cool at all. The explanation made him realize he needs to be with Shouko and he ran back home. Shouko was in labor and Keitatsu made it home shortly after the birth of their son. The story ends with the family celebrating a new family member.

Cast and credits 

 Screenwriter: Yoshikazu Okada

Cast 
 Ryoko Kuninaka as Uemura Eri
 Kenji Kohashi as Uemura Fumiya
 Shogo Suzuki as Uemura Kazuya
 Kyoko Maya as Uemura Shizuko
 Masaaki Sakai as Kohagura Keibun
 Yoshiko Tanaka as Kohagura Katsuko
 Tomi Taira as Kohagura Hana
 Aiko Sato as Kohagura Nanako
 Gori as Kohabura Keisho
 Takayuki Yamada as Kohagura Keitatsu
 Ayumi Yamaguchi as Kohabura Shoko
 Takehiro Murata
 Kimiko Yo
 Kazuo Kitamura as Shimada Daishin
 Yatsuko Tanami as Shimada Mizue
 Miho Kanno as Jyonouchi Maria
 Manami Konishi as Haruka
 Hiroki Kawata as Shimabukuro Shoichi
 Shinobu Miyara as Yonabaru Makoto
 Keiko Toda as Shimoyanagi Satoko
 Hayato Fujiki as Kaneshiro Masahide
 Kaoru Okunuki 
 Moeki Tsuruoka

Theme Song
Its theme song was  Ryoko Kuninaka.

See also
Related dramas:
Churasan 
Churasan 2

External links 
Gallery
Official Site
JDorama.com

Churasan 3
2004 Japanese television series debuts
NHK original programming